Phyllomydas scitulus is a species of mydas fly in the family Mydidae.

References

Mydidae
Articles created by Qbugbot
Insects described in 1886